Cody is a surname primarily of Irish origin, "an Anglicized form of Gaelic O'Cuidighthigh meaning 'descendant of Cuidightheach' (originally a byname for a helpful person), or of Mac Óda 'son of Óda' (a personal name of uncertain origin)". A Kilkenny family, formerly known as Archdeacon, assumed this name.

People with the surname "Cody" include

A
Ann Codee (1890–1961), Belgian actress, sometimes referred to as Anna Cody
Ann Cody (born 1963), American Paralympic athlete

B
Bec Cody (born 1973), American politician
Betty Cody (1921–2014), Canadian singer
Bill Cody (disambiguation), multiple people
Brian Cody (born 1954), Irish hurling coach
Buffalo Bill Cody (1846–1917), American cowboy

D
Dan Cody (born 1981), American football player
Diablo Cody (born 1978), American screenwriter
Diarmuid Cody (born 1994), Irish hurler
Don Cody (born 1936), Canadian businessman
Donnacha Cody (born 1985), Irish hurler

E
Ed Cody (1923–1994), American football player
Eileen Cody (born 1954), American politician
Eoin Cody (born 2000), Irish hurler
Evan Cody (born 1995), Irish hurler

F
Frank Cody (born 1948), American record producer

G
Gab Cody, American filmmaker
Gina Cody, Iranian-Canadian engineer
Gwendalyn F. Cody (1922–2021), American politician

H
Harry Cody, Canadian speed skater
Harry Cody (musician) (born 1962), Swedish musician
Henry John Cody (1868–1951), Canadian academic administrator
Hiram Alfred Cody (1872–1948), American author

I
Iron Eyes Cody (1907–1999), American actor

J
Jack Cody (1885–1963), American swimming coach
Jake Cody (born 1988), English poker player
James A. Cody (born 1965), American Air Force officer
Jennifer Cody (born 1969), American dancer
Jim Cody (1943–2022), Australian rugby league footballer
Joe Cody (1952–1989), American horse breeder
John Cody (disambiguation), multiple people
Josh Cody (1892–1961), American athletic coach

K
Kathleen Cody (disambiguation), multiple people
Kyle Cody (born 1994), American baseball player

L
Lara Cody (born 1957), American voice actress
Leslie Cody (1889–1969), Australian rugby league footballer
Lew Cody (1884–1934), American actor
Liza Cody (born 1944), British author

M
Mac Cody (born 1972), American football player
Matt Cody (1895–1974), Australian rules footballer
Melissa Cody (born 1983), American native weaver
Michael Cody (born 1997), Irish hurler
Morrill Cody (1901–1987), American diplomat

N

P
Patricia Cody (1940–2004), American tennis player

R
Radmilla Cody (born 1975), American native model
Richard A. Cody (born 1950), American general
Robert Tree Cody (born 1951), American native musician
Robin Cody (born 1943), American writer

S
Samuel Franklin Cody (1867–1913), American showman and aviator
Sara Cody, American doctor
Shaun Cody (born 1983), American football player
Sherwin Cody (1868–1959), American writer

T
Tay Cody (born 1977), American football coach
Terrence Cody (born 1988), American football player

W
Wayne Cody (1936–2002), American sportscaster
William Francis Cody (1916–1978), American architect

See also
Cody (given name), a page for people with the given name "Cody"
Colonel Cody (disambiguation), a disambiguation page for Colonels surnamed "Cody"
Commander Cody (disambiguation), a disambiguation page for "Commander Cody"
Codey, given name and surname

References